The Florence, El Dorado, and Walnut Valley Railroad was a short-line railroad in central Kansas.

History
In 1877, the Florence, El Dorado, and Walnut Valley Railroad Company built a branch line from Florence to El Dorado.  In 1881, it was extended to Douglass, and later to Arkansas City.  In 1901, the line was leased and operated by the Atchison, Topeka and Santa Fe Railway, which used the name "Florence & Arkansas City Division" for it.

The line from Florence to El Dorado was abandoned in 1942 to reclaim the metal rails for the war effort during World War II because of a shortage of materials during those years.

Currently, the remaining part of the former Florence, El Dorado, and Walnut Valley Railroad that still exists is:
 El Dorado to Arkansas City.

Stations
At a high-level, the railroad connected the primary cities of Florence (north end), El Dorado, Augusta, Winfield, Arkansas City (south end).

Marion County
 Florence (north end)
 Hampson, station 
 Burns

Butler County
 Alki, station
 De Graff
 El Dorado
 Augusta
 Douglass

Cowley County
 Rock
 Akron, station 
 Winfield
 Arkansas City (south end)

See also
 Marion and McPherson Railroad, a defunct railroad that started in Florence.
 Southern Transcon, currently uses tracks from El Dorado to Augusta.
 List of Kansas railroads

References

Further reading
 Stouffer's Railroad Map of Kansas; J.W. Stouffer; 1 page; 1915-1918.
 Standard Atlas of Marion County, Kansas; Geo. A. Ogle & Co; 103 pages; 1902.
 Standard Atlas of Butler County, Kansas; Geo. A. Ogle & Co; 69 pages; 1905.
 Standard Atlas of Cowley County, Kansas; Geo. A. Ogle & Co; 54 pages; 1905.

External links
 Current Kansas Railroad Map

Defunct Kansas railroads
Butler County, Kansas
Marion County, Kansas
Cowley County, Kansas
El Dorado, Kansas